Rainforest Foundation may refer to:

Rainforest Foundation Fund, the U.S. parent organization of:
Rainforest Foundation Norway
Rainforest Foundation UK
Rainforest Foundation US

See also
The Rainforest Fund